Hypenula cacuminalis, the long-horned owlet moth, is a moth of the family Erebidae. The species was first described by Francis Walker in 1859. It is found from the south-eastern United States west to Texas and Arizona.

The length of the forewings is 13–14 mm. Adults are mostly on wing from May to August, but have been recorded on wing from January to November in Florida. There are multiple generations per year in the southern part of the range.

The larvae probably feed on dead organic matter, such as dead leaves. Larvae can be found nearly year round.

References

Moths described in 1859
Herminiinae
Moths of North America